Osmorhiza claytonii is a North American perennial herb, native to Canada and the eastern United States.  It is also known as Clayton's sweetroot, sweet cicely, or woolly sweet cicely a name it shares with other members of its genus Osmorhiza.

Description

Leaves are large, compound, deeply divided, and dentate. Flowers are small , white, and clustered with others on a long-stalked umbel. Its native habitats include rich woods and wooded slopes.

The leaves are yellowish green. There are white hairs on the stem and to a lesser extent on the leaves as well. It is ternately branched, having three-leafed branches. When broken it has an anise like smell or flavor. 

The seeds of this plant have barbs on the end allowing them to stick to clothing, fur, or feathers.

Ecology
Small to medium-sized bees, wasps, flies, and beetles feed on the nectar and pollen of the flowers. The caterpillars of the butterfly Papilio polyxenes (Black Swallowtail) feed on the foliage.

Similar species
O. claytonii is very similar in appearance to Osmorhiza longistylis (long-styled sweet-cicely) with a similar geographic range. The roots of O. longistylis have a stronger anise smell than those of O. claytonii, and the  styles of the flowers protrude beyond the petals, while the styles of O. claytonii are shorter than the petals.

References

claytonii
Flora of Eastern Canada
Flora of the Northeastern United States
Flora of the Great Lakes region (North America)
Flora of the Southeastern United States
Flora of the Appalachian Mountains
Flora of the North-Central United States
Plants described in 1803